Yanko Hristov Valkanov (born 25 July 1982) is a Bulgarian football coach and former player who played as a defender. His preferred position on the pitch is right-back, but he can play as a central defender as well.

Career

Club

Early career in Bulgaria
He started his professional football career with CSKA Sofia in the 1999/2000 league season and was quickly loaned out to Beroe Stara Zagora to gain more playing time. The following season he was loaned out once more to Naftex Burgas, however he was unable to establish himself and returned to CSKA Sofia during the league season. At the beginning of the 2002/2003 league season he would transfer to Marek Dupnitsa and during his time with them he would attract the interests of Slavia Sofia and would join them before the start of the 2003/2004 where after several seasons he would establish himself as an integral member of their team.

Belarus and Lithuania
Yanko Valkanov joined reigning Belarusian Cup winners MTZ-RIPO Minsk during the 2006 league season and while he was a squad regular he could not establish himself as a first team regular. By the following season he would move to Lithuanian football club FBK Kaunas during the 2007 league season, however his time with them was not the most productive and halfway through the 2008 league season in July he would return to MTZ-RIPO Minsk.

Move to China
At the beginning of the 2009 China Super League season he transferred to Shanghai Shenhua. At first he was criticized for poor performances by both fans and the media, but he began to gain popularity on the other end of the pitch; he has so far scored 5 goals (3 in Chinese Super League, 2 in AFC Champions League), becoming the top scorer of his team. On 17 April, he scored two goals using his right shoulder in a Chinese Super League match against Shenzhen. At the end of 2009 season, his position was transformed to striker by Jia Xiuquan. But he played unbelievable jobs that he had made two assists to Aleksander Rodić at critical moment.

Valkanov transferred to Shenzhen Ruby on 28 February 2010. He was released by Shenzhen in July 2010 after New Zealand defender Ivan Vicelich joined the club.

Return to Belarus
On 8 September 2010, Valkanov signed with FC Dinamo Minsk until the end of the 2010 Belarusian Premier League season. He made his debut four days later in the 4:0 home win against FC Belshina Bobruisk, playing the full 90 minutes.

Later career

In 2011 Valkanov had a short spell with A PFG club Beroe. He signed with Kazakhstani club Akzhayik in February 2012.
On 14 July 2015, Valkanov returned to FC Akzhayik, helping them win the Kazakhstan First Division and gain promotion to the Kazakhstan Premier League.

In August 2017, Valkanov joined Tundzha Yagoda.

International career

He earned his first call-up to the national side for the friendly match against Azerbaijan, which was held on 17 November 2004.

Career statistics

International

Statistics accurate as of 11 November 2015

International goal

References

External links
Profile at Weltfussball.de 

1982 births
Living people
Sportspeople from Stara Zagora
Bulgarian footballers
Bulgaria international footballers
PFC CSKA Sofia players
PFC Beroe Stara Zagora players
PFC Naftex Burgas players
PFC Marek Dupnitsa players
PFC Slavia Sofia players
FC Partizan Minsk players
FBK Kaunas footballers
Shanghai Shenhua F.C. players
Shenzhen F.C. players
FC Dinamo Minsk players
FC Akzhayik players
FC Belshina Bobruisk players
FC Botev Galabovo players
FC Levski Karlovo players
First Professional Football League (Bulgaria) players
Second Professional Football League (Bulgaria) players
Belarusian Premier League players
A Lyga players
Chinese Super League players
Kazakhstan Premier League players
Bulgarian expatriate footballers
Bulgarian expatriate sportspeople in China
Bulgarian expatriate sportspeople in Kazakhstan
Expatriate footballers in Belarus
Expatriate footballers in Lithuania
Expatriate footballers in China
Expatriate footballers in Kazakhstan
Association football defenders
Bulgarian expatriate sportspeople in Belarus
Bulgarian expatriate sportspeople in Lithuania
Bulgarian football managers